The Spanish Intelligence Community is a group of intelligence organizations dependent on the Government of Spain that established themselves as an intelligence community through Law 11/2002. The intelligence community can be divided into three blocks:

 Foreign intelligence: Formed by the National Intelligence Center along with its minor agencies.
 Domestic intelligence: Formed mainly by the Intelligence Center for Counter-Terrorism and Organized Crime and other minor agencies.
 Military intelligence: Formed by the Armed Forces Intelligence Center and the agencies of each branch of the Armed Forces.

To all these agencies, must to be added the intelligence agencies from the different police corps of Spain. The Intelligence Community responds directly to the President of the Government of Spain and his Cabinet.

Members

Emblems
Most of Spanish Intelligence Agencies emblems and logos have its reproduction prohibited.

See also
 Australian Intelligence Community
 Israeli Intelligence Community
 Pakistani intelligence community
 Russian Intelligence Community
 United States Intelligence Community

References

Intelligence communities
Government agencies established in 2002
Spanish intelligence agencies
Government agencies of Spain